Philip or Phillip Green may also refer to:

Philip Green (born 1952), British businessman who was chairman of Arcadia
Philip Green (author) (born 1932), American author
Philip Green (composer) (1911–1982), British film score composer
Philip Nevill Green (born 1953), British businessman
Philip Palmer Green, American computational biologist
 Phil Green (politician), American politician from Michigan
Colonel Phillip Green, Star Trek character

See also
 Philip Greene (1920–2011), Irish sportscaster
 Philip H. Greene Jr., U.S. Navy admiral